Gompholobium viscidulum is a species of flowering plant in the pea family Fabaceae and is endemic to the south-west of Western Australia. It is an erect shrub with pinnate leaves with five to seven leaflets, and yellow flowers.

Description
Flowering occurs from September to November and the fruit is a cylindrical pod.

Taxonomy
Gompholobium viscidulum was first formally described in 1844 by Carl Meissner in Lehmann's Plantae Preissianae. The specific epithet (viscidulum) means "somewhat sticky".

Distribution and habitat
This species of pea grows on sandplains and on hillsides in the Avon Wheatbelt, Coolgardie, Esperance Plains and Mallee biogeographic regions of south-western Western Australia.

Conservation status
Gompholobium viscidulum is classified as "not threatened" by the Government of Western Australia Department of Biodiversity, Conservation and Attractions.

References

Mirbelioids
viscidulum
Fabales of Australia
Flora of Western Australia
Plants described in 1844
Taxa named by Carl Meissner